Radhika Sanghani is a writer and journalist for such publications as The Daily Telegraph and the author of such books as Virgin: A Novel and Not That Easy.

Education
Sanghani attended Haberdashers' Aske's School for Girls an independent school in Elstree, England and then went on to study English at University College London. Sanghani then did a Master of Arts in Newspaper journalism at City University.

Career
Sanghani was inspired to pursue a career in journalism by the example of Sue Lloyd-Roberts, particularly Roberts' work uncovering the restrictions on women's lives around the world. She worked as a graduate trainee for The Daily Telegraph in 2012 and continued to work for the publication as a features writer and columnist for five years. As of September 2017 she works as a freelance writer. Sanghani specialises in gender issues, social affairs and lifestyle feature writing.

In 2015, Sanghani made headlines by claiming that office air conditioning is sexist. This was met with reactions ranging from negative responses to outright mockery.

References

External links 

Living people
British journalists
British women novelists
British people of Indian descent
Year of birth missing (living people)